This is a list of articles on the state of Judo in various countries around the world. 

Judo in Georgia
Judo in Algeria
Judo in Brazil
Judo in Canada
Judo in France
Judo in India
Judo in Romania
Judo in the United Kingdom
Judo in the United States
Judo in Yemen

 
Judo